William Ernest (born December 16, 1950) is the CEO of Saudi Entertainment Ventures (SEVEN) Company. He had previously had occupied the role of president and managing director, Asia, for Walt Disney Parks & Resorts. He assumed this role in April 2008 and retired in early 2018 after a nearly 24-year career with Disney. Ernest was formerly the executive vice president and managing director of Hong Kong Disneyland Resort. Ernest was named to the position in January 2006, replacing Disney veteran Don Robinson. Previously, Ernest served as managing director of operations at the Hong Kong resort.

Early life and education
Ernest received bachelor's and master's degrees in hospitality management and recreational management from Southern Illinois University. A high school football player, he turned down a football scholarship to attend the Phillips Exeter Academy. I was this guys roommate at SIU in 1969-70 and he claims he went to a private school that year forgoing a football scholarship. Born in Dec 1950 I guess he could have started school at 5 years old.

Career
Before joining Disney in 1994 as general manager of Disney's Hilton Head Island Resort, Ernest opened more than 40 hotels for Marriott Corporation. After the Hilton Head position, Ernest was promoted to general manager of field businesses, where he was responsible for incorporating Disney's Vero Beach Resort into the company's Disney Vacation Club timeshare program. He later served as general manager of Disney's Caribbean Beach Resort, Disney's All-Star Sports Resort, Disney's All-Star Music Resort and Disney's All-Star Movies Resort at Walt Disney World Resort and vice president of operations and support for Disney Cruise Line. In 2018 he was named CEO of “Saudi Entertainment Ventures (SEVEN)”.

References

External links
 Hong Kong Disneyland Resort Official site

1950 births
Walt Disney Parks and Resorts people
Disney executives
Living people